The Wairau Hydro Scheme is a canal based hydroelectric project proposed by TrustPower on the Wairau River in Marlborough, New Zealand.

Resource consents 
Resource consents for this project were granted in 2008.  This decision was appealed to the Environment Court, which in 2010 decided in favour of the project. However, TrustPower put the project on hold in 2012, due to low electricity prices combined with rising construction costs. Consents for the scheme lapsed in 2021.

See also
 List of power stations in New Zealand
 Electricity sector in New Zealand

References

External links
TrustPower website

Proposed hydroelectric power stations
Buildings and structures in the Marlborough Region
Proposed renewable energy power stations in New Zealand